is a Japanese footballer currently playing as a midfielder for Vanraure Hachinohe.

Career statistics

Club
.

Notes

References

External links

Profile at Hachinohe
Profile at Akita

1995 births
Living people
Japanese footballers
Association football midfielders
Japan Football League players
J2 League players
J3 League players
Vanraure Hachinohe players
Blaublitz Akita players